The Unruochings were a Frankish noble family who established themselves in Italy. The family is named for the first member to come to prominence, Unruoch II of Friuli (floruit early 9th century).

The family members held various titles in northern Italy, including Margrave and Duke of Friuli, one of the lordships established on the eastern Marches of the Frankish Empire. The March of Friuli was considerably larger than modern Friuli, covering much of the modern Veneto and as far west as the Province of Brescia in Lombardy. 

The family's main landholdings, however, were in modern France, north of the River Seine, and southern Belgium. The family monastery, the centre of their power, was at Cysoing, near Tournai.

King Berengar I of Italy belonged to this family. Berengar left no male heirs, but the descendants of his daughter Gisela and Adalbert I of Ivrea including their son Berengar II of Italy, Berengar II's son Adalbert, and Adalbert's son Otto-William, Duke of Burgundy, are counted among the Unruochings.

Noted members of the family in the direct line included:
 Unruoch II of Friuli (floruit early 9th century)
 Berengar the Wise (died 835)
 Eberhard of Friuli (died 866)
 Unruoch III of Friuli (died c. 874)
 Berengar I of Italy (died 924)

References
 Riché, Pierre, Les Carolingiens. Une famille qui fit l'Europe. Paris: Hachette/Pluriel, 1997.